Kosmos 2175 ( meaning Cosmos 2175) was a Russian Yantar-4K2 photo reconnaissance satellite. It was the first satellite to be launched by the Russian Federation, following the breakup of the Soviet Union. It was launched by a Soyuz-U carrier rocket, flying from the Plesetsk Cosmodrome, on 21 January 1992.

It was the 63rd Yantar-4K2 satellite. Yantar-4K2 spacecraft are also designated Kobal't. Kosmos 2175 was deorbited, and recovered after atmospheric re-entry, on 20 March 1992, following a successful mission. Prior to this, two capsules had been returned with imagery aboard.

References

Spacecraft which reentered in 1992
Kosmos satellites
Yantar (satellite)
Spacecraft launched in 1992